Kiril Pandov (born 3 May 1943) is a Bulgarian boxer. He competed at the 1964 Summer Olympics and the 1968 Summer Olympics. At the 1964 Summer Olympics, he lost to Vasile Mariuţan of Romania in the Round of 16.

References

1943 births
Living people
Bulgarian male boxers
Olympic boxers of Bulgaria
Boxers at the 1964 Summer Olympics
Boxers at the 1968 Summer Olympics
Heavyweight boxers